Henry Mahlon Kimball (August 27, 1878 – October 19, 1935) was a politician from the U.S. state of Michigan.

Kimball was born in Orland, Indiana and attended the common and high schools of Orland. He graduated from Hillsdale College in Michigan and served as principal of Orland High School. He attended the literary and law departments of the University of Michigan at Ann Arbor, graduated in law in 1904, and commenced practice in Orland. In 1907, he moved to Rosebud in Pershing County, Nevada and continued the practice of law. He was later employed as a traveling auditor in 1908 for a firm in San Francisco, California. He moved to Portland, Oregon in 1909 and to Kalamazoo, Michigan in 1917, where he continued the practice of law.

Kimball was elected as a Republican from Michigan's 3rd congressional district to the 74th Congress serving from January 3, 1935 until his death in Kalamazoo. His remains were cremated and the ashes interred in Green Lawn Cemetery, Orland, Indiana.

See also 
 List of United States Congress members who died in office (1900–49)

References 

Henry M. Kimball at The Political Graveyard

1878 births
1935 deaths
Burials in Indiana
Hillsdale College alumni
Indiana lawyers
Michigan lawyers
University of Michigan Law School alumni
Republican Party members of the United States House of Representatives from Michigan
People from Orland, Indiana
20th-century American politicians